Scott Michael Dunlap (born August 16, 1963) is an American professional golfer who currently plays on the PGA Tour Champions, having previously been a member of the PGA Tour.

Early years
Born in Pittsburgh, Pennsylvania, Dunlap grew up in Sarasota, Florida. The valedictorian of the class of 1981 at Sarasota High School, he accepted an athletic scholarship to attend the University of Florida in Gainesville, where he played for the Florida Gators men's golf team in NCAA competition from 1982 to 1985.  During his 1985 senior season, the Gators won the Southeastern Conference (SEC) team championship, and Dunlap was recognized as a first-team All-SEC selection, an All-American, and the Golf Week Male Amateur of the Year.

While at Florida, he became a member of Delta Tau Delta fraternity. Dunlap graduated from Florida with a bachelor's degree in finance in 1986, the same year his younger sister, Page Dunlap, won the individual NCAA Women's Golf Championship while playing for the Florida Gators women's golf team.

Pro career
Dunlap played on the Web.com Tour in 1990, 1998, and from 2003 to 2013, and has two victories. He played on the PGA Tour in 1996–97, 1999–2002, and 2012. His best finishes on PGA Tour were a trio of tied for third places: 1996 Bell Canadian Open, 1999 Doral-Ryder Open, and 2000 The Players Championship and his best finish on the year-end money list was 44th in 2000. He had top ten finishes in major championships at the Open Championship in 1999 at Carnoustie and the PGA Championship in 2000 at Valhalla.

Champions Tour
Dunlap turned 50 in August 2013 and began playing the Champions Tour full-time in 2014; he won his first title at the Boeing Classic near Seattle that August, defeating Mark Brooks on the first hole of a sudden-death playoff. At the par-5 18th, Dunlap's second shot stopped four feet (1.3 m) from the pin. The winner's share was $300,000 and along with the trophy, he received a leather flight jacket.

Amateur wins
this list may be incomplete
1984 Southern Amateur

Professional wins (12)

Sunshine Tour wins (2)

Nationwide Tour wins (2)

Canadian Tour wins (2)
1994 Manitoba Open
1995 Canadian Masters

Tour de las Américas wins (5)
1996 Abierto del Litoral
1998 Peru Open
1999 Peru Open, Argentine Open
2000 Peru Open

Champions Tour wins (1)

Champions Tour playoff record (1–0)

Results in major championships

Note: Dunlap never played in the Masters Tournament.

CUT = missed the half-way cut
"T" = tied

Results in The Players Championship

CUT = missed the halfway cut
"T" indicates a tie for a place

Results in World Golf Championships

1Cancelled due to 9/11

QF, R16, R32, R64 = Round in which player lost in match play
"T" = Tied
NT = No tournament

Results in senior major championships
Results not in chronological order before 2022.

"T" = Tied
CUT = missed the halfway cut
NT = No tournament due to COVID-19 pandemic

See also

1995 PGA Tour Qualifying School graduates
1998 PGA Tour Qualifying School graduates
2011 PGA Tour Qualifying School graduates
List of Florida Gators men's golfers on the PGA Tour

References

External links

American male golfers
Florida Gators men's golfers
PGA Tour golfers
Sunshine Tour golfers
PGA Tour Champions golfers
Golfers from Pittsburgh
Golfers from Georgia (U.S. state)
Sportspeople from the Atlanta metropolitan area
People from Duluth, Georgia
1963 births
Living people